WSHP-LP is a community low-power FM radio station, licensed and operated by the Roman Catholic Diocese of Raleigh, and broadcasting from Cary, North Carolina. The station's primary programming is religious, provided by Radio Católica Mundial, Eternal Word Television Network's (EWTN) Spanish language radio service. Due to its short antenna height and low power of just 37 watts, coverage is primarily limited to central and eastern Cary.

History

The initial application to construct the station was filed in November 2013, and plans for this station, along with WFNE-LP in Wake Forest, North Carolina, were announced in 2014.  The original application specified a transmitter site on the St. Michael the Archangel parish grounds at 804 High House Road in Cary. This was later modified to a cellular telephone tower located a short distance west of downtown Cary along Old Apex Road.

WSHP-LP was first licensed on February 21, 2018. Its original programming consisted of EWTN's English service, in addition to Ave Maria Radio and locally produced religious programs and announcements. In July 2018 WSHP-LP temporarily suspended operations, as Divine Mercy prepared to transfer the EWTN programming to AM 540, WETC, which went live in February 2019. WSHP-LP resumed broadcasting in March 2019, now with Spanish language programs from EWTN's Radio Católica Mundial.

References

External links
 

SHP-LP
SHP-LP
Radio stations established in 2018
2018 establishments in North Carolina
SHP-LP